São Gabriel is a municipality in the state of Rio Grande do Sul, Brazil.

Notable people 
Sepe Tiaraju (-1756), Indigenous chief and military leader, killed in São Gabriel at the hands of Portuguese and Spanish colonial soldiers.
Baron of Candiota (c. 1815–1894), landowner and military officer
Hermes da Fonseca (1855-1923), 8th president of Brazil
Joaquim Francisco de Assis Brasil (1857-1938), politician
José Plácido de Castro (1873–1908), revolutionary and military leader in the Acre War
Mascarenhas de Morais (1883-1968), commander of the Brazilian Expeditionary Force in World War II

Paleontology 
In the vicinity of the city of São Gabriel fossils of ancient amphibians and reptiles whose ages range from the Permian to the Triassic have been found .

Three vertebrate-bearing geological formations and localities are as follows:

 Irati Formation (Passo São Borja). Age: Early Permian.
 Rio do Rasto Formation (Posto Queimado). Age: Late Permian and/or Early Triassic.
 Sanga do Cabral Formation (Abandoned railroad between Dilermando de Aguiar and São Gabriel). Age: Late Triassic.

See also
List of municipalities in Rio Grande do Sul

References 

Municipalities in Rio Grande do Sul